The 2005 UCI Europe Tour was the first season of the UCI Europe Tour. The season began on 10 February 2005 with the Grand Prix Cycliste la Marseillaise and ended on 13 October 2005 with the Giro del Piemonte. Murilo Fischer of Brazil was crowned as the 2005 UCI Europe Tour.

Throughout the season, points are awarded to the top finishers of stages within stage races and the final general classification standings of each of the stages races and one-day events. The quality and complexity of a race also determines how many points are awarded to the top finishers, the higher the UCI rating of a race, the more points are awarded.

The UCI ratings from highest to lowest are as follows:
 Multi-day events: 2.HC, 2.1 and 2.2
 One-day events: 1.HC, 1.1 and 1.2

Events

Final standings
There is a competition for the rider, team and country with the most points gained from winning or achieving a high place in the above races.

Individual classification

Team classification

Nation classification

External links
 

UCI Europe Tour

UCI